Mandala Football Club (or abbreviated Mandala FC) is an Indonesian football team based at Warung Jambu Stadium, Majalengka Regency, West Java. They currently compete in Liga 3.

References

External links

Majalengka Regency
Football clubs in Indonesia
Football clubs in West Java
Association football clubs established in 1999
1999 establishments in Indonesia